The JAC Refine S3 is a Compact CUV produced by JAC Motors under the Refine sub-brand.

Overview
Originally launched on the 2013 Shanghai Auto Show as the Heyue S30 under the Heyue sub-brand, the compact crossover was quickly rebranded to Refine S3 shortly after during the 2014 Beijing Auto Show. 

Pricing of the Refine S3 was revealed later during the 2014 Chengdu Auto Show with prices ranging from 65,800 yuan to 84,800 yuan. The JAC Refine S3 is powered by the HFC4GB2.3E 1.5 liter naturally aspirated engine producing 113hp mated to a selection of 	
5-speed manual, 6-speed manual, and CVT gearboxes. The facelifted Refine S3 crossover was launched on the 2016 Chengdu Auto Show in China.

2016 facelift
The 2016 facelift includes redesigned grilles, triangle shaped fog lights, new headlights, new rear lights, new bumpers, and an updated interior. It also introduces the new JAC corporate logo.

2019 facelift
At the 2019 Shanghai Auto Show, JAC Motors released the redesigned 2019 JAC Refine S3. The 2019 facelift features a redesigned front fascia and a restyled rear bumper resulting in a 20mm increase in the vehicle length. The interior of 2019 model has also been adjusted with the floating central control large screen greatly improved with enhanced visual effect. The instrument panel display is double-cylinder design with high display resolution and adjustable brightness. 

The 2019 JAC Refine S3 is powered by the same HFC4GB2.3E 1.5 liter naturally aspirated engine producing 114hp, and equipped with a large speed ratio gearbox for higher transmission efficiency.

References

External links

Official website

Refine S3
Compact sport utility vehicles
Front-wheel-drive vehicles
2010s cars
Cars introduced in 2013
Cars of China